

Men's events

Women's events

Team events

Medal table

1991
Events at the 1991 Pan American Games
1991 in shooting sports